Mitchell County may refer to:
 
 Mitchell County, New South Wales, Australia
 Mitchell County, Georgia,  United States
 Mitchell County, Iowa, United States
 Mitchell County, Kansas,  United States
 Mitchell County, North Carolina, United States
 Mitchell County, Texas, United States

County name disambiguation pages